The Epistles of Wisdom or Rasa'il al-Hikmah is a corpus of sacred texts and pastoral letters by teachers of the Druze faith native to the Levant, which has currently close to a million practitioners.

The Druze canon
The full Druze canon or Druze scripture includes the Old Testament, the New Testament, the Quran and philosophical works by Plato and those influenced by Socrates among works from other religions and philosophers. The Druze claim that an understanding of these is necessary, but that their al-ʻUqqāl, ("the Knowledgeable Initiates") have access to writings of their own that supersede these.

The Epistles of Wisdom are also referred to as the Kitab al-Hikma (Book of Wisdom) and al-Hikma al-Sharifa. Other ancient Druze writings include the Rasa'il al-Hind (Epistles of India) and the previously lost (or hidden) manuscripts such as al-Munfarid bi-Dhatihi and al-Sharia al-Ruhaniyya as well as others including didactic and polemic treatises.

Druze manuscripts are generally written in a language, grammar, and diction that to the uninitiated is hard to understand and includes ambiguous words and highly obscure and cryptic phrases, in-addition to the extensive usage of symbology and numerology in much of the writings.

The Druze religious establishment's interpretation of taqiyya and the esoteric nature of the faith led to the restriction of access, inquiry and investigation from even their own uninitiated Druze known as al-Juhhāl ("the Ignorant") or jismaniyeen ("the Material Ones"). Such restrictions aimed to prevent possible damage to the individual and community if the writings were interpreted incorrectly, since the study of the Epistles of Wisdom is better accompanied by commentary texts and guidance from the higher ranking Druze Uqqal ("Knowledgeable Ones").

Description
The Epistles of Wisdom were written in the Arabic language and contain one hundred eleven epistles in total. They are organised into six books first compiled by one of the greatest Druze sages Abd Allah al-Tanukhi in 1479 AD. According to oral traditions there were originally twenty-four books. Eighteen are reasonably assumed to have been lost, hidden or destroyed. Epistle number six is dated earliest and was written in July 1017 AD by Hamza ibn-'Ali ibn-Ahmad and he is specifically mentioned as the author of thirty more epistles in the first two books. Epistles 109 and 110 are dated latest, written by al-Muqtana Baha'uddin in 1042 AD. Epistles 36 to 40 are attributed to Isma'il al-Tamimi ibn Muhammad. The first epistle opens with the goodbye message from al-Hakim bi-Amr Allah, the original teacher of the Druze. He details his efforts to assist his people's welfare and peace and urges them to remain upright. It is believed by the Druze from interpretation of the epistles that al-Hakim did not die, but merely withdrew into occultation and will return one day and reveal the Druze wisdom to the world in order to inaugurate a golden age.

Contents 
The epistles contain philosophical discourses about Neoplatonic and Gnostic subjects, Ptolemaic cosmology, Arabic paraphrases of the philosophies of Farabi, Plotinus and Proclus, writings on the Universal Soul along with several polemic epistles concerning other faiths and philosophies that were present during that time and towards individuals who were considered renegades or those who tried to distort and tarnish the reputation of the faith and its teachings such as the "Answering the Nusayri" epistle and the fifth volume of the Epistles. Most of the Epistles are written in a post-classical language, often showing similarities to Arab Christian authors.

The texts provide formidable insight into the incorporation of the Universal Intellect and the soul of the world in 11th century Egypt, when the deity showed itself to men through Fatimid Caliph al-Hakim and his doctrines. These display a notable form of Arabic Neoplatonism blended with Ismailism and adopted Christian elements of great interest for the philosophy and history of religions.

Translations
A Syrian physician gave one of the first Druze manuscripts to Louis XIV in 1700, which is now kept in the Bibliothèque Nationale. Local disturbances such as the invasion of Ibrahim Pasha between 1831 and 1838, along with the 1860 Lebanon conflict caused some of these texts to fall into the hands of academics. Other original manuscripts are held in the Robert Garrett collection at Princeton University. The first French translation was published in 1838 by linguist and orientalist Antoine Isaac, Baron Silvestre de Sacy in Expose de la religion des Druzes.

Another edition of the Rasa'il al-hikma was published by pseudonymous writers in Lebanon in 1986 as part of the highly controversial "The Hard Truth" series which included several anti-Druze, anti-Alawite and anti-Islamic books and was banned by the authorities for containing misleading information and hate speech, also an unpublished dissertation by David Bryer was prepared on the first two volumes. A French translation and critical examination of these first two volumes (epistles one to forty) from the Epistles of Wisdom was published in 2007 by Daniel de Smet who has provided a doctrinal introduction, notes, a description and inventory of the manuscripts and studies of their contents and characteristics.

Quotes

On the concept of God, Hamza ibn Ali wrote

On the concept of reincarnation and the universal soul, Baha'uddin wrote 

On the concept of atheism, Baha'uddin argued 

Regarding the secrecy of the epistles of wisdom, Hamza ibn Ali wrote 
However he did remark 

With regards the unity of God and how to remain in a state of peace of mind and contentment (Rida (Arabic: رضا))  and find knowledge of true love, Hamza ibn Ali left us a message

References

External links
 The Druze Heritage Foundation
 The American Druze Society

1479 books
Anthologies
Gnostic texts
Religious texts
Druze